Claudia Louise Cholakian (born 29 July 1996) is a soccer player who plays as a attacker for Sydney Olympic. Born in Australia, she is an Armenia international.

Career

Cholakian started her career with Australian second-tier side Manly United. In 2017, she joined King's College London in England. In 2020, Cholakian signed for Australian top flight club Sydney FC. In 2021, Cholakian signed for Sydney Olympic in the Australian second tier.

Cholakian completed a Masters in Sustainability at the University of Sydney, and is currently employed as a Sustainability Advisor for property developer Frasers Property.

References

External links
 Claudia Cholakian at GameDay

1996 births
Living people
A-League Women players
Armenia women's international footballers
Armenian expatriate sportspeople in England
Armenian women's footballers
Women's association football forwards
Australian expatriate sportspeople in England
Australian people of Armenian descent
Australian women's soccer players
Manly United FC players
Sydney FC (A-League Women) players
Sydney Olympic FC players